The Asansol–Gonda Express is an Express train belonging to Eastern Railway zone that runs between  and  in India. It is currently being operated with 13509/13510 train numbers on a weekly basis.

Service

The 13509/Asansol–Gonda Express has an average speed of 41 km/hr and covers 861 km in 20h 45m. The 13510/Gonda–Asansol Express has an average speed of 43 km/hr and covers 861 km in 20h 15m.

Route and halts 

The important halts of the train are:

Coach composition

The train has standard ICF rakes with max speed of 110 kmph. The train consists of 16 coaches:

 1 AC III Tier
 7 Sleeper coaches
 6 General
 2 Seating cum Luggage Rake

Traction

Both trains are hauled by an Andal Loco Shed-based WDM-3A or WDP-4D diesel locomotive from Gonda to Asansol and vice versa.

Rake sharing

The train shares its rake with 13507/13508 Asansol–Gorakhpur Express.

Direction reversal

The train reverses its direction 1 times:

See also 

 Gonda Junction railway station
 Asansol Junction railway station
 Asansol–Gorakhpur Express

Notes

References

External links 

 13509/Asansol–Gonda Express
 13510/Gonda–Asansol Express

Transport in Gonda, Uttar Pradesh
Transport in Asansol
Express trains in India
Rail transport in West Bengal
Rail transport in Jharkhand
Rail transport in Bihar
Rail transport in Uttar Pradesh
Railway services introduced in 2011